The men's 4 x 400 metres relay at the 2011 Asian Athletics Championships was held at the Kobe Universiade Memorial Stadium on the 8 and 10 of July.

Medalists

Records

Results

Final

References

Relays 4x400
Relays at the Asian Athletics Championships